List of teachers ("masters") of Malvern College is a list of some of the notable masters and headmasters (past and present) of Malvern College, a leading UK independent day and boarding school in Malvern, Worcestershire, England. They have gained recognition or excelled in such fields as education, science, culture and sport.

Headmasters
1865: Rev. Arthur Faber
1880–1885: Rev. Charles Thomas Cruttwell
1885–1894: Rev. John Willis Kearns
1894–1897: Rev. William Grundy
1897–1914: Rev. Sydney Rhodes James
1914–1937: Frank Sansome Preston 
1937–1953: Rev. Canon Howard Charles Adie Gaunt (known as Tom Gaunt)
1953–1971: Donald Dunrod Lindsay CBE (27.09.1910-14.11.2003), chairman of the HMC
1971–1982: Martin John Wyndham Rogers OBE, Chairman of HMC
1983–1996: Roy de C. Chapman, chairman of the HMC (1994), schools inspector
1997–2006: Hugh C. K. Carson
2006–2007: David Dowdles
2008–2019: Antony Roy Clark
2019–present: Keith Metcalfe

Other masters and mistresses
 Matthew Bayfield, master, headmaster of Eastbourne College, co-composer of Carmen Malvernense
 Ralph Blumenau, history teacher, philosophy historian and author
 Christina Boxer, director of girls’ sport, former Olympic champion
 Rory Boyle, music educationalist, composer.
 Charles Brett, music teacher, countertenor
 Gerry Chalk, cricketer who taught at the school 1934–1938. Later captained Kent County Cricket Club and was shot down and died over northern France in 1943
 George Chesterton, deputy headmaster, cricketer, author
 Alan Duff, master, cricketer
 Charles Fiddian-Green, master, head of cricket, cricketer
 Julius Harrison, director of music ; classical composer and conductor
 John Hart, classics master, the first ever male Mastermind winner in 1975, defendant in Pepper v Hart, Librarian and Curator of the Worcestershire Masonic Library and Museum Trust
 Graeme Hick, cricket coach, former England and Worcestershire cricketer
 The Very Rev Robert Holtby, chaplain (1952–54), clergyman, Dean of Chichester
 Ron Hughes, rackets professional and master
 John Lewis OBE, physics master, pioneer of educational programmes, recipient of the Centenary Award for science teaching.
 David Loveday, chaplain, Bishop of Dorchester
 Major Ralph Lyon, director of music, co-composer of Carmen Malvernense
 Malcolm Nokes, chemistry teacher, former Olympic bronze medallist
 Wilfrid Noyce, master of modern languages (1946–50), mountaineer, the first man to reach the South Col of Everest in Sir John Hunt's celebrated expedition in 1953
 George Sayer, English master and biographer of the author C. S. Lewis
 Jeffrey Skitch, biology teacher, actor and operatic baritone best known for his performances and recordings with the D'Oyly Carte Opera Company.
 Robert Tims,  chemistry master, housemaster, head of St Leonards School, principal examiner for IB chemistry
 Charles Toppin sports master, cricketer
 Philip Turner, history master, children's fiction writer
 Eric William Kevin Walton GC, engineering lecturer, recipient of the Albert Medal and the Polar Medal

References

People associated with Malvern, Worcestershire
People by educational institution in Worcestershire
Malvern